Tonight's the Night is ROMEO's second Japanese single. There are five different versions available, whose covers includes one of the five letters of the artist's name each.

Track listing

Credits

Charts

References

External links
 
 

SS501 songs
2012 singles
Japanese-language songs
Songs written by Jeff Miyahara
2012 songs
Victor Entertainment singles
Songs written by Her0ism